Mutale is a name of Zambian origin that may refer to:
Mutale Nalumango (born 1955), Zambian educator and politician  
Bernard Mutale, Zambian football defender 
Billy Mutale (born 1993), Zambian footballer
Edith Mutale (born 1994), Zambian women ambassador
Kelvin Mutale (1969–1993), Zambian footballer 
Lucky Mutale (born 1955), retired Zambian boxer
Vincent Mutale (born 1973), Zambian footballer 

Bemba-language surnames
Bemba-language given names
Zambian surnames